Nellie Elizabeth "Irish" McCalla (December 25, 1928 – February 1, 2002) was an American film and television actress and artist best known as the title star of the 1950s television series Sheena, Queen of the Jungle. She co-starred with actor Chris Drake. McCalla was also a "Vargas Girl" model for pin-up girl artist Alberto Vargas.

Biography

Early life
Born in Pawnee City, Nebraska, she was one of eight siblings born to Lloyd, a butcher, and Nettie (née Geiger) McCalla. The family moved often, settling in Des Moines, Iowa, in late 1939, when Lloyd began working for Condon Bros. meat dealers. The family lived at 1070 10th Street. The family moved to Marshalltown, Iowa, in November 1941, and to Omaha, Nebraska in September 1942, before returning to Pawnee City, where she completed high school. At age 17, she joined some of her siblings in Southern California, where she worked as a waitress and at an aircraft factory.

In 1951, she married insurance salesman Patrick McIntyre, with whom she had two sons. McCalla was already a popular pinup model by 1952, when several other models and she appeared in the film River Goddesses, comprising voluptuous young women frolicking in Glen Canyon.

Sheena

McCalla recalled being discovered by a Nassour Studios representative while throwing a bamboo spear on a Malibu, California, beach, adding of her Sheena experience, "I couldn't act, but I could swing through the trees". Her 26-episode series aired in first-run syndication from 1955-56.

The athletic McCalla said she performed her own stunts on the series, filmed in Mexico, until the day she grabbed an unsecured vine and slammed into a tree, breaking her arm. Her elder son, Kim McIntyre, once told the press he remembered watching his mother swinging from vine to vine and wrestling mechanical alligators. Following the one-season Sheena, McCalla appeared in five films from 1958 to 1962, and guest roles on the TV series Have Gun — Will Travel and Route 66.

Later life and art career
McCalla and McIntyre divorced in 1957, and the following year, McCalla married English actor and James Joyce/Sherlock Holmes scholar Patrick Horgan. They divorced in January 1969. In 1982, 
McCalla, then living in Malibu, California, married Chuck Rowland, a national sales manager for an auto-glass firm, and moved with him to Prescott, Arizona, where she lived out her days. They separated in 1989.

As an artist, she drew numerous oil paintings and collector plates, and sold prints of her work. She was a member of Woman Artists of the American West, and her work has been displayed at the Los Angeles Museum of Arts and Sciences. She made personal appearances at autograph conventions, appearing as late as 1996 in a faux-leopard Sheena costume.

Death
At age 73 in 2002, Irish McCalla died of a stroke and complications from her fourth brain tumor.

Legacy
 McCalla has a star on the Hollywood Walk of Fame, at 1722 Vine Street.
 As one writer described the effect of McCalla's signature character on girls growing up in that era, "Sheena was the only female portrayed on the tube who didn't conform to the fifties stereotype. Sheena was a real rugged individualist. Watching her struggle with a new adventure every week made me feel more capable at a time when everything was so unexplored. If she could handle the jungle, I felt sure that I could handle my world".
 Asteroid 83464 Irishmccalla, discovered by astronomer Roy A. Tucker in 2001, was named in her memory. The official  was published by the Minor Planet Center on September 18, 2005.

Selected filmography
 Sheena, Queen of the Jungle (1955–1956) TV series, 26 episodes — Sheena
 Queen of the Jungle (film) (1956) First official Sheena, Queen of the Jungle movie Never released in the USA. Not to be confused with a serial using the same title. - Sheena
 She Demons (1958) — Jerrie Turner
 The Beat Generation (1959); reissued as This Rebel Age — Marie Baron
 Five Gates to Hell (1959) — Sister Magdalena
 Hands of a Stranger, also known as The Answer (1962) — Holly
 Have Gun – Will Travel (1963) episode "Bob Wire" — Anna Anderson

Magazine bibliography

Cover
 Eve   October 1950, December 1950
 Cavalier   (back cover) 1951 Vargas "4 of Diamonds" McCalla nude
 Night and Day   January 1951, September 1951
 Show   November 1952
 Jest   May 1957
 Fabulous Females   No. 1 1955
 People Today   August 11, 1954
 Focus  September 1954
 Vue   March 1956
 Blighty   (UK), 6April1957, Iss. 910
 Snappy   March 1957 (back cover)
 Ultra Filmfax   Apr-May 1998
 Scarlet Street   No. 23

Interiors
1950s
 Night and Day – August and September 1950; January, March, April & September 1951; February, April, May and August 1952; January, February, March, July, and October 1953; and February 1956
 Famous Models – Sept.-October 1951
 Frolic – July and May 1951, February 1955
 Man (UK) – August 1952
 Pagent – August 1952
 People Today – 1952 Vol.5, No.6, December 1957
 T.V. Star Parade – February 1956
 Gala – March 1952 (vol.2, #6, pg.25) and January 1955 (vol.5, #5)
 Vue – October 1952 and March 1956
 Photo – October 1954
 Point – March 1954, December 1955
 Tempo – March 21, 1955
 Man's – June 1955
 Picture week – March 27, 1956
 Show – October 1956
1980s
 Starweek – August 1982
1990s
 Preview Pin Up Special 2 – Aug.-October 1994
 Tease – No.3, 1995
 Femme Fatales – January 1999
 Playboy – March 1997 ("Glamourcon" by Kevin Cook), January 1999 ("Sex Stars of the Century"), Special Edition (August 1999, "Sex Stars of the Century")
 Celebrity Sleuth – 1991 (vol.5, #1, "Separate But Sequel: Irish McCalla"), 1996 (vol.9, #9, "Sheena Lives") and 1997 (vol.11, #1, "Star-Tistics")
 Irish of the Jungle – AC Comics, 1992
 Jungle Girls #4 & #5 – AC Comics, 1992
 TV's Original Sheena: Irish McCalla – AC Comics, 1992
 Good Girl Quarterly #11 – AC Comics, 1993
 The Golden Age of Sheena – AC Comics, 1999
 Wild Woman #1 – AC Comics, 1999
2000s
 Playboy – December 2001 ("Sheena's World") and February 2008 ("Sheena, Queen of the Jungle, Without Her Wrap" by Leonard Martin)
 Femforce #118 Special Edition – AC Comics, 2003
 Alberto Vargas: Works from the Max Vargas Collection by Reid Stewart Austin & Hugh Hefner (2006). A painting and sketch of McCalla

Record album covers
 Big Dame Hunters (1960) Irish McCalla wearing a leopard print bikini on cover - Crown Records
 Latin Twist (1959) — Crown Records – CLP 5171

References

Further reading
 Ultra Filmfax   April 1988, Issue 66, pp. 74–78, by Herb Fagen, "Sheena, Queen of the Jungle"
 Preview   October 1994, Vol. 3, Issue 2, pp. 34–39, by Steranko, "The She-Cat Who Put the She in Sheena" 
 Alberto Vargas: Works from the Max Vargas Collection, by Reid Stewart Austin, Hugh Hefner. 144 pp (2006); 
 Playboy   February 2008, vol. 55, #2, pp. 60–68, by Leonard Maltin, "Sheena, Queen of the Jungle, Without Her Wrap, Irish McCalla"
 Black, Bill. TV's Original Sheena: Irish McCalla (Paragon Publications/AC Comics);

External links

 
 
 Holloway, Clark J. "Sheena, Queen of the Jungle", The Holloway Pages (fansite), 2000

American film actresses
American television actresses
20th-century American actresses
Deaths from brain cancer in the United States
Actresses from Nebraska
Deaths from cancer in Arizona
1928 births
2002 deaths
People from Marshalltown, Iowa
People from Pawnee City, Nebraska